Servet Çetin (born 17 March 1981) is a Turkish footballer who last played for Mersin Idmanyurdu in the Süper Lig. He received the nickname Ayıboğan which literally means; a man who could choke a bear, due to his height and strength. He also has the nickname "Türkü Baba" due to the numerous Turkish folk songs on his iPod.

Club career

Kartalspor
Servet Çetin joined Kartalspor in 1990 after the club manager called his house looking for his older brother İrfan who was playing as a midfielder for the club at the time.  Servet informed the club's manager that his older brother was not home and would not be returning until later that evening.  The club's manager, in a bind to find players for the match later that day, questioned Servet's interest in football and upon learning that he was interested, Servet was invited to join the club as an amateur player and played in the match later that day as a right fullback.

Servet was signed onto professional terms at the start of the 1999–2000 season.

Göztepe
He joined Göztepe at the start of the 2001–02 season. Having a successful first season in the Turkish Super League his club finished 7th and missed out on a UEFA Cup berth.

Denizlispor
He was signed by Rıza Çalımbay for Denizlispor at the start of the 2002–03 season in a deal which also involved Ersen Martin and Mustafa Özkan.  Despite missing out on the UEFA Cup with Göztepe, Servet got a chance to play European football at his new club as Denizlispor.  He was an integral part of the team which eliminated Lorient, Sparta Prague and Lyon in the first, second and third rounds of the competition respectively.  In the fourth round, Denizlispor lost to the eventual winners – José Mourinho's Porto.

Servet had become a household name in Turkish football with his performances for Denizlispor in the league as well as for the Turkish U21 National Team.

Fenerbahçe
With interest in Servet high by the big clubs in Turkey, Denizlispor reached an agreement with Fenerbahçe for a reported $1.5 million for the strong centre back to start the 2003–04 season. As Fenerbahçe won the Turkish Super League, Servet only managed 8 league appearances in his first season at the club with manager Christoph Daum regularly preferring the pairing of Fabio Luciano and Önder Turacı at the heart of the defense.

Fenerbahçe won the league for a second season in a row in 2004/05 with Servet partnering Fabio Luciano for most of the season at the heart of the defense.  An injury in March 2005 cut his season short and Servet did not return to action until September of later that year. After finally returning from injury Servet once again became a first choice in the centre of defense for Fenerbahçe.

After the sacking of Christoph Daum at the end of the 2005–06 season, his replacement Zico signed the central defender pairing of Diego Lugano and Edu Dracena. With first team opportunities looking unlikely, Servet joined Sivasspor on the transfer deadline day in 2006, with Fenerbahçe not demanding a fee.

Sivasspor
Sivasspor and manager Bülent Uygun welcomed the experience of Servet at the heart of defense as he became a regular in the side and he once again re-discovered his old form, helping lead Sivasspor to 7th place.  At the end of the season, Servet was on the move again with Galatasaray the interested party this time.  The move was for a reported $600,000.

Galatasaray
Servet signed a three-year contract with Galatasaray on 15 April 2007. After settling into the team and under the tutelage of Karl-Heinz Feldkamp, Servet's play improved immensely and he managed to become a favourite of Galatasaray fans shortly thereafter. Servet reaffirmed his importance to the club with an impressive first season with Galatasaray. He was partnered with Rigobert Song in the first half of the season and by Emre Güngör in the second half of the season. Servet made almost 50 appearances and chipped in with five goals in the league winning campaign and became a fixture in the Turkish National Team.  He was also selected for the Euro 2008 squad by Fatih Terim.

After returning from Euro 2008, Servet continued to be a fixture in Galatasaray's defense. However, his season was cut short in late February 2009 as a foot injury he suffered kept him out for the rest of the season. This injury came at the worst time possible as Galatasaray's back line was ravaged with injuries. Galatasaray finished the season 5th in the league but reached the last 16 of the UEFA Cup.

The 2009–10 season also brought change at Galatasaray as Frank Rijkaard was appointed manager. Servet began the season with a new partner at the heart of the defense with the newly signed Gökhan Zan, Servet's central defence partner for the Turkish National Team. Servet's play suffered under the manager's new system as Rijkaard demanded that defenders play the ball out of the defence, which was never the towering defender's strong point. After Gökhan Zan suffered a serious shoulder injury, Galatasaray signed Lucas Neill for the heart of the defence.

After the end of the 2011–12 season, the club did not want to renew his contract, so he became a free agent from 1 June 2012.

Eskişehirspor
He Signed for Eskişehirspor in the summer of 2012.

Mersin Idmanyurdu
Servet Çetin signed for Mersin Idmanyurdu in 2014.

Atiker Konyaspor
Servet Çetin signed for Atiker Konyaspor in 2016.

International career

Çetin progressed through the youth ranks of the National Team, from Under-17 to the full senior squad. He made his debut for Turkey in a 0–4 friendly match loss against Czech Republic on 30 April 2003, coming on for Alpay Özalan in the 83rd minute. He made two appearances at the FIFA Confederations Cup in 2003. He captained the international side for the first time during Turkey's 2–1 win against Bosnia and Herzegovina in October 2008.

Euro 2008
Çetin played in the qualifiers for the European Championships and featured in the finals of the tournament itself. However, he picked up injuries during the group stages and meant he could only feature in three of Turkey's games as they progressed to the semi-finals.

Playing style
He is known as 'Bionic Servet' for his strength and bravery to push on playing despite serious injuries. In Euro 2008 Servet's injuries included a torn groin, strained knee ligaments, a broken tooth and a bruised hip bone all at once. Another nickname used for Çetin is 'Terminator Servet' due to the face-mask he obtained after his cheekbone was broken.

Career statistics

Club

Also played 1 (2008) Turkish Super Cup match.

International

International goals

Honours
Fenerbahçe
Süper Lig (2): 2003–04, 2004–05

Galatasaray
Süper Lig (2): 2007–08, 2011–12
Süper Kupa (1): 2007–08

Turkey
FIFA Confederations Cup: 2003 (bronze)
 UEFA European Championship bronze medalist: 2008

Personal life
Çetin is of Azerbaijani descent.

References

External links

Profile at Galatasaray.org
 
 
 

1981 births
Living people
People from Tuzluca
Turkish footballers
Turkey international footballers
Turkey B international footballers
Turkey under-21 international footballers
Turkey youth international footballers
Turkish people of Azerbaijani descent
2003 FIFA Confederations Cup players
UEFA Euro 2008 players
Kartalspor footballers
Göztepe S.K. footballers
Denizlispor footballers
Fenerbahçe S.K. footballers
Sivasspor footballers
Galatasaray S.K. footballers
Eskişehirspor footballers
Mersin İdman Yurdu footballers
Süper Lig players
Association football defenders